Aris B.C. in international competitions is the history and statistics of Aris B.C. in FIBA Europe and Euroleague Basketball Company competitions.

1960s

1966–67 FIBA European Cup Winners' Cup, 2nd–tier
The 1966–67 FIBA European Cup Winners' Cup was the 1st installment of FIBA's 2nd-tier level European-wide professional club basketball competition FIBA European Cup Winners' Cup (lately called FIBA Saporta Cup), running from December 8, 1966 to April 13, 1967. The trophy was won by Ignis Varese, who defeated Maccabi Tel Aviv by a result of 144–135 in a two-legged final on a home and away basis. Overall, Aris achieved in the present competition a record of 1 win against 1 defeat, in two successive rounds. More detailed:

First round
 Bye

Top 16
 Tie played on January 12, 1967 and on January 19, 1967.

|}

1970s

1974–75 FIBA Korać Cup, 3rd–tier
The 1974–75 FIBA Korać Cup was the 4th installment of the European 3rd-tier level professional basketball club competition FIBA Korać Cup, running from November 5, 1974 to March 25, 1975. The trophy was won by the title holder Birra Forst Cantù, who defeated CF Barcelona by a result of 181–154 in a two-legged final on a home and away basis. Overall, Aris achieved in present competition a record of 1 win against 1 defeat, in two successive rounds. More detailed:

First round
 Bye

Second round
 Tie played on November 26, 1974 and on December 3, 1974.

|}

1976–77 FIBA Korać Cup, 3rd–tier
The 1976–77 FIBA Korać Cup was the 6th installment of the European 3rd-tier level professional basketball club competition FIBA Korać Cup, running from October 19, 1976 to April 5, 1977. The trophy was won by Jugoplastika, who defeated Alco Bologna by a result of 87–84 at Palasport della Fiera in Genoa, Italy. Overall, Aris achieved in present competition a record of 0 wins against 2 defeats, in two successive rounds. More detailed:

First round
 Bye

Second round
 Tie played on November 16, 1976 and on November 23, 1976.

|}

1977–78 FIBA Korać Cup, 3rd–tier
The 1977–78 FIBA Korać Cup was the 7th installment of the European 3rd-tier level professional basketball club competition FIBA Korać Cup, running from November 15, 1977 to March 21, 1978. The trophy was won by Partizan, who defeated Bosna by a result of 117–110 (OT) at Sportska dvorana Borik in Banja Luka, Yugoslavia. Overall, Aris achieved in present competition a record of 0 wins against 2 defeats, in only one round. More detailed:

First round
 Tie played on November 15, 1977 and on November 22, 1977.

|}

1980s

1979–80 FIBA European Champions Cup, 1st–tier
The 1979–80 FIBA European Champions Cup was the 23rd installment of the European top-tier level professional basketball club competition FIBA European Champions Cup (now called EuroLeague), running from November 11, 1979 to March 27, 1980. The trophy was won by Real Madrid, who defeated Maccabi Tel Aviv by a result of 89–85 at Deutschlandhalle in West Berlin, West Germany. Overall, Aris achieved in the present competition a record of 3 wins against 3 defeats, in only one round. More detailed:

First round
 Day 1 (October 10, 1979)

|}

 Day 2 (October 18, 1979)

|}

 Day 3 (November 1, 1979)

|}
*Overtime at the end of regulation (95–95).

 Day 4 (November 8, 1979)

|}

 Day 5 (November 22, 1979)

|}

 Day 6 (November 29, 1979)

|}

 Group D standings:

1980–81 FIBA Korać Cup, 3rd–tier
The 1980–81 FIBA Korać Cup was the 10th installment of the European 3rd-tier level professional basketball club competition FIBA Korać Cup, running from October 8, 1980 to March 19, 1981. The trophy was won by Joventut Freixenet, who defeated Carrera Venezia by a result of 105–104 (Overtime (sports)|OT) at Palau Blaugrana in Barcelona, Spain. Overall, Aris achieved in the present competition a record of 4 wins against 4 defeats, in three successive rounds. More detailed:

First round
 Bye

Second round
 Tie played on November 5, 1980 and on November 12, 1980.

|}

Top 16
 Day 1 (December 10, 1980)

|}

 Day 2 (December 17, 1980)

|}

 Day 3 (January 14, 1981)

|}

 Day 4 (January 21, 1981)

|}

 Day 5 (January 28, 1981)

|}

 Day 6 (February 4, 1981)

|}

 Group C standings:

1981–82 FIBA Korać Cup, 3rd–tier
The 1981–82 FIBA Korać Cup was the 11th installment of the European 3rd-tier level professional basketball club competition FIBA Korać Cup, running from October 7, 1981 to March 18, 1982. The trophy was won by Limoges CSP, who defeated Šibenka by a result of 90–84 at Palasport San Lazzaro in Padua, Italy. Overall, Aris achieved in present competition a record of 1 win against 1 defeat, in two successive rounds. More detailed:

First round
 Bye

Second round
 Tie played on November 4, 1981 and on November 11, 1981.

|}

1982–83 FIBA Korać Cup, 3rd–tier
The 1982–83 FIBA Korać Cup was the 12th installment of the European 3rd-tier level professional basketball club competition FIBA Korać Cup, running from October 6, 1982 to March 8, 1983. The trophy was won by the title holder Limoges CSP, who defeated -for second consecutive time- Šibenka by a result of 94–86 at Deutschlandhalle in West Berlin, West Germany. Overall, Aris achieved in present competition a record of 1 win against 3 defeats, in two successive rounds. More detailed:

First round
 Tie played on October 6, 1982 and on October 13, 1982.

|}

Second round
 Tie played on November 3, 1982 and on November 10, 1982.

|}

1983–84 FIBA European Champions Cup, 1st–tier
The 1983–84 FIBA European Champions Cup was the 27th installment of the European top-tier level professional basketball club competition FIBA European Champions Cup (now called EuroLeague), running from September 15, 1983 to March 29, 1984. The trophy was won by Banco di Roma, who defeated FC Barcelona by a result of 79–73 at Patinoire des Vernets in Geneva, Switzerland. Overall, Aris achieved in the present competition a record of 5 wins against 1 defeats, in three successive rounds. More detailed:

First round
 Tie played on September 15, 1983 and on September 22, 1983.

|}

Second round
 Tie played on September 29, 1983 and on October 6, 1983.

|}

Top 12
 Tie played on October 27, 1983 and on November 3, 1983.

|}

1984–85 FIBA Korać Cup, 3rd–tier
The 1984–85 FIBA Korać Cup was the 14th installment of the European 3rd-tier level professional basketball club competition FIBA Korać Cup, running from October 3, 1984 to March 21, 1985. The trophy was won by Simac Milano, who defeated Ciaocrem Varese by a result of 91–78 at Palais du Midi in Brussels, Belgium. Overall, Aris achieved in present competition a record of 8 wins against 4 defeats, in four successive rounds. More detailed:

First round
 Tie played on October 3, 1984 and on October 10, 1984.

|}

Second round
 Tie played on October 31, 1984 and on November 7, 1984.

|}

Top 16
 Day 1 (December 5, 1984)

|}

 Day 2 (December 12, 1984)

|}

 Day 3 (January 9, 1985)

|}

 Day 4 (January 16, 1985)

|}

 Day 5 (January 23, 1985)

|}

 Day 6 (January 30, 1985)

|}

 Group D standings:

Semifinals
 Tie played on February 20, 1985 and on February 27, 1985.

|}

1985–86 FIBA European Champions Cup, 1st–tier
The 1985–86 FIBA European Champions Cup was the 29th installment of the European top-tier level professional basketball club competition FIBA European Champions Cup (now called EuroLeague), running from September 19, 1985 to April 3, 1986. The trophy was won by Cibona, who defeated Žalgiris by a result of 94–82 at Sportcsarnok in Budapest, Hungary. Overall, Aris achieved in the present competition a record of 4 wins against 2 defeats, in three successive rounds. More detailed:

First round
 Tie played on September 19, 1985 and on September 26, 1985.

|}

Second round
 Tie played on October 3, 1985 and on October 10, 1985.

|}

Top 12
 Tie played on October 31, 1985 and on November 7, 1985.

|}

1986–87 FIBA European Champions Cup, 1st–tier
The 1986–87 FIBA European Champions Cup was the 30th installment of the European top-tier level professional basketball club competition FIBA European Champions Cup (now called EuroLeague), running from September 18, 1986 to April 2, 1987. The trophy was won by Tracer Milano, who defeated Maccabi Tel Aviv by a result of 71–69 at Centre Intercommunal de Glace de Malley in Lausanne, Switzerland. Overall, Aris achieved in the present competition a record of 3 wins against 1 defeat, in three successive rounds. More detailed:

First round
 Bye

Second round
 Tie played on October 2, 1986 and on October 9, 1986.

|}

Top 12
 Tie played on October 30, 1986 and on November 6, 1986.

|}

1987–88 FIBA European Champions Cup, 1st–tier
The 1987–88 FIBA European Champions Cup was the 31st installment of the European top-tier level professional basketball club competition FIBA European Champions Cup (now called EuroLeague), running from September 24, 1987 to April 7, 1988. The trophy was won by Tracer Milano, who defeated Maccabi Tel Aviv by a result of 90–84 at Flanders Expo in Ghent, Belgium. Overall, Aris achieved in the present competition a record of 11 wins against 7 defeats, in five successive rounds. More detailed:

First round
 Bye

Top 16
 Tie played on October 15, 1987 and on October 22, 1987.

|}

Quarterfinals
 Day 1 (November 26, 1987)

|}

 Day 2 (December 3, 1987)

|}

 Day 3 (December 10, 1987)

|}

 Day 4 (December 17, 1987)

|}

 Day 5 (January 7, 1988)

|}

 Day 6 (January 14, 1988)

|}

 Day 7 (January 21, 1988)

|}

 Day 8 (February 11, 1988)

|}

 Day 9 (February 18, 1988)

|}

 Day 10 (February 25, 1988)

|}

 Day 11 (March 3, 1988)

|}

 Day 12 (March 10, 1988)

|}

 Day 13 (March 17, 1988)

|}

 Day 14 (March 24, 1988)

|}

 Quarterfinals group stage standings:

Final four
The 1988 FIBA European Champions Cup Final Four, was the 1987–88 season's FIBA European Champions Cup Final Four tournament, organized by FIBA Europe

 Semifinals: April 5, 1988 at Flanders Expo in Ghent, Belgium.

|}

 3rd place game: April 7, 1988 at Flanders Expo in Ghent, Belgium.

|}

 Final four standings:

1988–89 FIBA European Champions Cup, 1st–tier
The 1988–89 FIBA European Champions Cup was the 32nd installment of the European top-tier level professional basketball club competition FIBA European Champions Cup (now called EuroLeague), running from October 13, 1988 to April 6, 1989. The trophy was won by Jugoplastika, who defeated Maccabi Tel Aviv by a result of 75–69 at Olympiahalle in Munich, West Germany. Overall, Aris achieved in the present competition a record of 12 wins against 8 defeats, in five successive rounds. More detailed:

First round
 Tie played on October 13, 1988 and on October 20, 1988.

|}

Top 16
 Tie played on November 3, 1988 and on November 10, 1988.

|}

Quarterfinals
 Day 1 (December 8, 1988)

|}

 Day 2 (December 15, 1988)

|}

 Day 3 (December 22, 1988)

|}

 Day 4 (January 5, 1989)

|}

 Day 5 (January 12, 1989)

|}

 Day 6 (January 19, 1989)

|}

 Day 7 (January 26, 1989)

|}

 Day 8 (February 2, 1989)

|}

 Day 9 (February 16, 1989)

|}

 Day 10 (February 23, 1989)

|}

 Day 11 (March 2, 1989)

|}

 Day 12 (March 9, 1989)

|}

 Day 13 (March 16, 1989)

|}

 Day 14 (March 23, 1989)

|}

 Quarterfinals group stage standings:

Final four
The 1989 FIBA European Champions Cup Final Four, was the 1988–89 season's FIBA European Champions Cup Final Four tournament, organized by FIBA Europe

 Semifinals: April 4, 1989 at Olympiahalle in Munich, West Germany.

|}

 3rd place game: April 6, 1989 at Olympiahalle in Munich, West Germany.

|}

 Final four standings:

1990s

1989–90 FIBA European Champions Cup, 1st–tier
The 1989–90 FIBA European Champions Cup was the 33rd installment of the European top-tier level professional basketball club competition FIBA European Champions Cup (now called EuroLeague), running from September 28, 1989 to April 19, 1990. The trophy was won by Jugoplastika, who defeated FC Barcelona Banca Catalana by a result of 72–67 at Pabellón Príncipe Felipe in Zaragoza, Spain. Overall, Aris achieved in the present competition a record of 10 wins against 8 defeats, in five successive rounds. More detailed:

First round
 Bye

Top 16
 Tie played on October 26, 1989 and on November 2, 1989.

|}

Quarterfinals
 Day 1 (December 7, 1989)

|}

 Day 2 (December 14, 1989)

|}

 Day 3 (January 4, 1990)

|}

 Day 4 (January 11, 1990)

|}

 Day 5 (January 18, 1990)

|}

 Day 6 (January 25, 1990)

|}

 Day 7 (February 1, 1990)

|}

 Day 8 (February 8, 1990)

|}

 Day 9 (February 22, 1990)

|}

 Day 10 (March 1, 1990)

|}

 Day 11 (March 8, 1990)

|}

 Day 12 (March 15, 1990)

|}

 Day 13 (March 22, 1990)

|}

 Day 14 (March 29, 1990)

|}

 Quarterfinals group stage standings:

Final four
The 1990 FIBA European Champions Cup Final Four, was the 1989–90 season's FIBA European Champions Cup Final Four tournament, organized by FIBA Europe.

 Semifinals: April 17, 1990 at Pabellón Príncipe Felipe in Zaragoza, Spain.

|}

 3rd place game: April 19, 1990 at Pabellón Príncipe Felipe in Zaragoza, Spain.

|}

 Final four standings:

1990–91 FIBA European Champions Cup, 1st–tier
The 1990–91 FIBA European Champions Cup was the 34th installment of the European top-tier level professional basketball club competition FIBA European Champions Cup (now called EuroLeague), running from September 27, 1990 to April 18, 1991. The trophy was won by POP 84, who defeated FC Barcelona Banca Catalana by a result of 70–65 at Palais Omnisports de Paris-Bercy in Paris, France. Overall, Aris achieved in the present competition a record of 9 wins against 7 defeats, in three successive rounds. More detailed:

First round
 Bye

Top 16
 Tie played on October 25, 1990 and on November 1, 1990.

|}

Quarterfinals
 Day 1 (December 13, 1990)

|}

 Day 2 (December 20, 1990)

|}

 Day 3 (January 3, 1991)

|}

 Day 4 (January 10, 1991)

|}

 Day 5 (January 17, 1991)

|}

 Day 6 (January 24, 1991)

|}

 Day 7 (January 31, 1991)

|}

 Day 8 (February 7, 1991)

|}
*Two overtimes at the end of regulation (82–82 and 89–89).

 Day 9 (February 14, 1991)

|}

 Day 10 (February 28, 1991)

|}

 Day 11 (March 7, 1991)

|}

 Day 12 (March 14, 1991)

|}

 Day 13 (March 21, 1991)

|}

 Day 14 (March 28, 1991)

|}

 Quarterfinals group stage standings:

1991–92 FIBA European League, 1st–tier
The 1991–92 FIBA European League was the 35th installment of the European top-tier level professional basketball club competition FIBA European League (now called EuroLeague), running from September 12, 1991 to April 16, 1992. The trophy was won by Partizan, who defeated Montigalà Joventut by a result of 71–70 at Abdi İpekçi Arena in Istanbul, Turkey. Overall, Aris achieved in the present competition a record of 7 wins against 11 defeats, in three successive rounds.  More detailed:

First round
 Tie played on September 12, 1991 and on September 19, 1991.

|}

Second round
 Tie played on October 3, 1991 and on October 10, 1991.

|}

Top 16
 Day 1 (October 31, 1991)

|}

 Day 2 (November 7, 1991)

|}

 Day 3 (November 28, 1991)

|}

 Day 4 (December 5, 1991)

|}

 Day 5 (December 12, 1991)

|}

 Day 6 (December 19, 1991)

|}
*Overtime at the end of regulation (98–98).

 Day 7 (January 9, 1992)

|}

 Day 8 (January 16, 1992)

|}

 Day 9 (January 23, 1992)

|}

 Day 10 (January 30, 1992)

|}

 Day 11 (February 6, 1992)

|}

 Day 12 (February 13, 1992)

|}

 Day 13 (February 20, 1992)

|}

 Day 14 (February 27, 1992)

|}

 Group B standings:

1992–93 FIBA European Cup, 2nd–tier
The 1992–93 FIBA European Cup was the 27th installment of FIBA's 2nd-tier level European-wide professional club basketball competition FIBA European Cup (lately called FIBA Saporta Cup), running from September 8, 1992 to March 16, 1993. The trophy was won by Sato Aris, who defeated Efes Pilsen by a result of 50–48 at Palasport Parco Ruffini in Turin, Italy. Overall, Sato Aris achieved in the present competition a record of 16 wins against 1 defeat, in six successive rounds. More detailed:

First round
 Bye

Second round
 Tie played on September 29, 1992 and on October 6, 1992.

|}

Third round
 Tie played on October 27, 1992 and on November 3, 1992.

|}

Top 12
 Day 1 (November 25, 1992)

|}

 Day 2 (December 1, 1992)

|}

 Day 3 (December 8, 1992)

|}

 Day 4 (December 15, 1992)

|}

 Day 5 (January 5, 1993)

|}

 Day 6 (January 13, 1993)

|}

 Day 7 (January 20, 1993)

|}

 Day 8 (January 26, 1993)

|}

 Day 9 (February 2, 1993)

|}

 Day 10 (February 9, 1993)

|}

 Group B standings:

Semifinals
 Best-of-3 playoff: Game 1 away on February 18, 1993 / Game 2 at home on February 23, 1993.

|}

Final
 March 16, 1993 at Palasport Parco Ruffini in Turin, Italy.

|}

1993–94 FIBA European Cup, 2nd–tier 
The 1993–94 FIBA European Cup was the 28th installment of FIBA's 2nd-tier level European-wide professional club basketball competition FIBA European Cup (lately called FIBA Saporta Cup), running from September 7, 1993 to March 15, 1994. The trophy was won by Smelt Olimpija, who defeated Taugrés by a result of 91–81 at Centre Intercommunal de Glace Malley in Lausanne, Switzerland. Overall, Sato Aris achieved in the present competition a record of 11 wins against 6 defeats, in five successive rounds. More detailed:

First round
 Bye

Second round
 Tie played on September 27, 1993 and on October 5, 1993.

|}

Third round
 Tie played on October 26, 1993 and on November 2, 1993.

|}
*The score in the second leg at the end of regulation was 81–68 for Hapoel Givatayim, so it was necessary to play an extra-time to decide the winner of this match.

Top 12
 Day 1 (November 23, 1993)

|}

 Day 2 (November 30, 1993)

|}

 Day 3 (December 7, 1993)

|}

 Day 4 (December 14, 1993)

|}

 Day 5 (January 4, 1994)

|}

 Day 6 (January 11, 1994)

|}

 Day 7 (January 18, 1994)

|}

 Day 8 (January 25, 1994)

|}

 Day 9 (February 1, 1994)

|}

 Day 10 (February 8, 1994)

|}

 Group B standings:

Semifinals
 Best-of-3 playoff: Game 1 at home on February 17, 1994 / Game 2 away on February 22, 1994 / Game 3 away on February 24, 1994.

|}
*Overtime at the end of regulation (69–69).

1994–95 FIBA Korać Cup, 3rd–tier
The 1994–95 FIBA Korać Cup was the 24th installment of the European 3rd-tier level professional basketball club competition FIBA Korać Cup, running from September 7, 1994 to March 15, 1995. The trophy was won by Alba Berlin, who defeated Stefanel Milano by a result of 172–166 in a two-legged final on a home and away basis. Overall, Aris Intersalonica achieved in present competition a record of 2 wins against 2 defeats, in three successive rounds. More detailed:

First round
 Bye

Second round
 Tie played on September 28, 1994 and on October 5, 1994.

|}

Third round
 Tie played on October 26, 1994 and on November 2, 1994.

|}

1995–96 FIBA Korać Cup, 3rd–tier
The 1995–96 FIBA Korać Cup was the 25th installment of the European 3rd-tier level professional basketball club competition FIBA Korać Cup, running from September 6, 1995 to March 13, 1996. The trophy was won by Efes Pilsen, who defeated Stefanel Milano by a result of 146–145 in a two-legged final on a home and away basis. Overall, Aris Moda Bagno achieved in present competition a record of 6 wins against 4 defeats, in four successive rounds. More detailed:

First round
 Bye

Second round
 Tie played on September 27, 1995 and on October 4, 1995.

|}

Third round
 Tie played on October 25, 1995 and on October 31, 1995.

|}

Top 16
 Day 1 (November 22, 1995)

|}

 Day 2 (November 29, 1995)

|}

 Day 3 (December 6, 1995)

|}

 Day 4 (December 13, 1995)

|}

 Day 5 (December 20, 1995)

|}

 Day 6 (January 3, 1996)

|}

 Group C standings:

1996–97 FIBA Korać Cup, 3rd–tier
The 1996–97 FIBA Korać Cup was the 26th installment of the European 3rd-tier level professional basketball club competition FIBA Korać Cup, running from September 11, 1996 to April 3, 1997. The trophy was won by Aris, who defeated Tofaş by a result of 154–147 in a two-legged final on a home and away basis. Overall, Aris achieved in present competition a record of 12 wins against 4 defeats, in seven successive rounds. More detailed:

First round
 Bye

Second round
 Day 1 (October 2, 1996)

|}

 Day 2 (October 9, 1996)

|}

 Day 3 (October 16, 1996)

|}

 Day 4 (November 6, 1996)

|}

 Day 5 (November 13, 1996)

|}

 Day 6 (November 20, 1996)

|}

 Group A standings:

Third round
 Tie played on December 4, 1996 and on December 11, 1996.

|}
*Game played on January 7, 1997. The original second leg played on December 11, 1996, was abandoned after a massive brawl between Greek and Turkish players.

Top 16
 Tie played on January 15, 1997 and on January 22, 1997.

|}

Quarterfinals
 Tie played on February 12, 1997 and on February 19, 1997.

|}

Semifinals
 Tie played on March 5, 1997 and on March 12, 1997.

|}
*The score in the second leg at the end of regulation was 72–68 for Benetton Treviso, so it was necessary to play an extra-time to decide the winner of this match.

Finals
 Tie played on March 26, 1997 at Alexandreio Melathron in Thessaloniki, Greece and on April 3, 1997 at Bursa Atatürk Spor Salonu in Bursa, Turkey.

|}

European competitions

Record 
Aris has overall from 1966–67 (first participation) to 2018–19 (last participation): 270 wins and 1 draw against 188 defeats in 459 games for all European club competitions.
 (1st–tier) FIBA European Champions Cup or FIBA European League & EuroLeague: 81–62 in 143 games.
 (2nd–tier) FIBA European Cup Winner's Cup or FIBA European Cup or FIBA Saporta Cup: 46–20 in 66 games.
 (2nd–tier) ULEB Cup or EuroCup: 56–41 in 97 games.
(2nd–tier) FIBA Champions League: 16–1–19 in 36 games.
 (3rd–tier) FIBA Korać Cup: 48–34 in 82 games.
 (3rd–tier) FIBA Europe League: 12–7 in 19 games.
 (4th–tier) FIBA Europe Champions Cup: 14–6 in 20 games.
 (4th–tier)
FIBA Europe Cup: 3–3 in 6 games.

See also
 Greek basketball clubs in international competitions

Notes

References

External links
FIBA Europe
EuroLeague
ULEB
EuroCup

Aris B.C.
Greek basketball clubs in European and worldwide competitions